Arnaldo Rafel "Arnie" Muñoz (born June 21, 1982) is an Dominican former professional baseball pitcher. Muñoz bats and throws left-handed.

Career
It was a disaster as Muñoz allowed eleven runs in three innings (including nine in the second inning alone) tying for third all-time for most runs allowed in a major league debut. By game score, it was the worst debut start since earned runs became official in 1913. Muñoz went back to the minors, then returned in September, pitching fairly well in relief.

2007
Muñoz's contract was purchased by the Washington Nationals in September . Muñoz became the Nationals' left-handed specialist after the team traded Ray King to the Milwaukee Brewers.

2008–present
Before the start of the season, it was not certain whom the Nationals would use as their left-handed specialist. Although neither was on the 40-man roster, both Muñoz and Ray King were invited to spring training. However, Muñoz was assigned to the Double-A Harrisburg Senators of the Eastern League at the end of the preseason. He became a free agent at the end of the season; he did not play in 2009.

In 2010, Muñoz pitched for Petroleros de Minatitlan of the Mexican League, compiling a 1–2 record and a 2.77 ERA, in what was his last year as a professional ballplayer.

References

External links

1982 births
Living people
Águilas Cibaeñas players
Arizona League White Sox players
Birmingham Barons players
Burlington Bees players
Charlotte Knights players
Chicago White Sox players
Columbus Clippers players
Dominican Republic expatriate baseball players in the United States
Harrisburg Senators players
Kannapolis Intimidators players

Major League Baseball pitchers
Major League Baseball players from the Dominican Republic
People from Santa Cruz de Mao
Washington Nationals players